American Idols Live! Tour 2007 was a summer concert tour in the United States and Canada featuring the top 10 contestants of the sixth season of American Idol, which aired in 2007. It was sponsored by Kellogg's Pop-Tarts. The 59-date tour started on July 6 and ended on September 23.

It follows in the tradition of other American Idol summer tours following the completion of each season in May.

Performers

Show overview
The show was largely dominated by ensemble performances.  With the exception of Jordin Sparks, Blake Lewis and Sanjaya Malakar, every other performers each had only one solo performance.  The first half ended with the Blake Lewis' set, while Jordin Sparks performed her set before the traditional final performance by all 10 performers.   The final group performance however differed from previous tours by being a collection of solos rather than a group song with each performer reprising a short segment of their solo song.

Setlist

 Chris Sligh, Gina Glocksen, Haley Scarnato, Sanjaya Malakar, Phil Stacey, Chris Richardson, Blake Lewis and Jordin Sparks – "Let's Get It Started" (The Black Eyed Peas)
 Melinda Doolittle and Lakisha Jones – "Baby Love" (The Supremes) and "Stop! In the Name of Love" (The Supremes)
 Doolittle, Jones and Richardson – "I Heard It Through the Grapevine" (Marvin Gaye)
 Doolittle and Malakar – "Proud Mary" (Ike & Tina Turner)
 Stacey – "Blaze of Glory"  (Jon Bon Jovi)
 Glocksen and Sligh – "Thnks fr th Mmrs" (Fall Out Boy)
 Scarnato – "When God-Fearin' Women Get the Blues" (Martina McBride)
 Malakar – "Thriller" (Michael Jackson) and "The Way You Make Me Feel" (Michael Jackson)
 Sligh – "Typical" (Mutemath)
 Scarnato, Glocksen and Jones – "Lady Marmalade" (Labelle)
 Sligh, Malakar and Stacey – "I Want It That Way" (Backstreet Boys)
 Sparks and Richardson – "What Hurts the Most" (Rascal Flatts)
 Sparks and Doolittle – "This Will Be (An Everlasting Love)" (Natalie Cole)
 Lewis – "Time of the Season" (The Zombies), "She Will Be Loved" (Maroon 5)/"With or Without You" (U2), "You Give Love a Bad Name" (Bon Jovi)
Intermission

 Stacey (Glocksen, Scarnato, Jones, and Doolittle on backup) – "America the Beautiful"
 Glocksen, Scarnato, Jones and Doolittle – "Boogie Woogie Bugle Boy" (The Andrews Sisters), "America" (Prince)
 Sligh, Malakar, Stacey, Richardson, and Lewis – "Crazy" (Gnarls Barkley) and "Hey Jude" (The Beatles)
 Glocksen – "Who Knew" (Pink)
 Lewis and Richardson – "Ain't No Sunshine" (Bill Withers), "Virtual Insanity" (Jamiroquai), "Geek in the Pink" (Jason Mraz) and "SexyBack" (Justin Timberlake)
 Jones – "I Will Always Love You (Whitney Houston)
 Richardson – "This Love" (Maroon 5)
 Stacey and Glocksen – "It's Your Love" (Tim McGraw & Faith Hill)
 Sligh, Scarnato, Malakar, and Richardson- "Life Is a Highway" (Tom Cochrane)
 Doolittle – "(You Make Me Feel Like) A Natural Woman" (Aretha Franklin)
 Glocksen, Scarnato, Jones and Doolittle – "Ain't No Other Man" (Christina Aguilera)
 Sparks – "I (Who Have Nothing) (Shirley Bassey), Heartbreaker" (Pat Benatar), "You Were Meant for Me" (Jewel), "A Broken Wing" (Martina McBride), Livin' on a Prayer (Bon Jovi) and This Is My Now (Jordin Sparks)
 Top 10 Finale – "Blaze of Glory" (Stacey), "The Way You Make Me Feel" (Malakar), "When God-Fearin' Woman Gets the Blues" (Scarnato), "Typical" (Sligh), "You Give Love a Bad Name" (Lewis), "Who Knew" (Glocksen), "This Love" (Richardson), "I Will Always Love You" (Jones), "Natural Woman" (Doolittle), "This Is My Now" (Sparks)

Additional notes
 At some of the shows, Blake Lewis came onto the stage in disguise as the janitor before the show started.
 Blake Lewis performed his song "She Loves the Way" at the last show in Manchester, New Hampshire.
 In the original set list, Jones was to perform "And I Am Telling You I'm Not Going" instead of "I Will Always Love You".
 Two songs performed in the first show in Sunrise, Florida were cut in later shows – Blake Lewis's duet with Melinda Doolittle "Killing Me Softly with His Song" (Roberta Flack) and "Another One Bites The Dust" (Queen) by Sligh Glocksen, Scarnato and Doolittle.  The two songs were performed before and after Richardson's This Love.
 The songs performed during Blake Lewis duet with Chris Richardson varied at different shows.
 In the earlier shows, Blake Lewis' "She Will Be Loved" was done without segueing into part of "With or Without You".
 Blake Lewis claimed he locked Sanjaya Malakar up in a closet during the tour for being "disrespectful".

Special occasions
During the August 7, 2007 concert in Rosemont, Illinois, Gina Glocksen was surprised as her long-time boyfriend proposed to her following her duet with Phil Stacey.

After Sanjaya Malakar's solo during the September 9, 2007 concert in Washington, D.C., Sanjaya's sister Shyamali surprised him onstage.  She placed a Fanjaya crafted "birthday boy" crown on his head as she led the audience in singing "Happy Birthday" to Sanjaya on the eve of his 18th birthday.

Tour dates

Response
The 2007 tour turned out to be much less successful than the Season 5 tour. None of its first 30 shows were sellouts and only one stop bested the 93% capacity mark and that was the July 18 stop in Jordin Sparks' hometown of Glendale, Arizona. In addition 14 of the first 30 shows were below the 60% capacity mark. The lower attendance was blamed on the cast of contestants as well as the ticket prices. Nevertheless, due to the higher ticket prices, the tour managed to gross over 23 million in U.S. dollars with nearly 400,000 tickets sold as totaled from the tour receipts of the 54 shows that reported to Billboard. It was ranked number 41 in Pollstar Year End Top 100 Tour for 2007 with a gross of 20.9 million from the 50 shows that reported to Pollstar.

Tour summary
Number of shows – 59 (none sold out)
Total gross – $23,178,930 (53 shows; revenues in Indianapolis and Memphis are unknown)
Total attendance – 383,331 (55 shows)
Average attendance – 6,970 (69.3%)
Average ticket price – $59.93
Highest gross – Rosemont, Illinois – $605,172
Lowest gross – Nampa, Idaho – $217,035
Highest attendance – East Rutherford, New Jersey – 10,136 (86.0%) – average of 2 shows in East Rutherford
Lowest attendance – Nampa, Idaho – 3,577 (44.6%)

References

External links
Tour info from the American Idol official website
Official Tour Website

American Idol concert tours
2007 concert tours